The Mano Gai or Manogi airstrike was the killing of Afghan children in Mano Gai, Dara-I-Pech District, Kunar province, Afghanistan on March 1, 2011.

Nine boys aged 8–14 were killed by gunfire from NATO helicopters while collecting firewood for their family.

The next day hundreds of Afghan villagers protested the killing chanting slogans against the United States and the Afghan government as they marched to the bombing site. General David Petraeus said "We are deeply sorry" while Mohammed Bismil, the 20-year-old brother of two boys killed in the strike said "I don't care about the apology. The only option I have is to pick up a Kalashnikov, RPG or a suicide vest to fight." President Hamid Karzai called the attack "ruthless".

See also
Deh Bala wedding party bombing 47 civilians mostly children killed in Nangarhar province, 2008
Granai airstrike 86-145 civilians, mostly children killed in Farah province, 2009

References

External links 
 Police chief confirms 9 children killed in ISAF raid
 Child air strike deaths stir fury in Afghanistan AFP March 6, 2011
 U.S. apology for Afghan deaths "not enough": Karzai Reuters March 6, 2011
 NATO Gunships Kill 9 Afghan Children; 3rd Reported Attack on Afghan Civilians in 2 Weeks – video report by Democracy Now!

2011 in Afghanistan
Airstrikes during the War in Afghanistan (2001–2021)
Civilian casualties in the War in Afghanistan (2001–2021)
History of Kunar Province
March 2011 events in Asia
Attacks in Afghanistan in 2011
2011 airstrikes